Capsize means to turn over a boat or ship.

Capsize or Capsized may also refer to:

 "Capsize" (song), by Frenship, 2016
 Capsize (knot), to change its form and rearrange its parts
 Capsized!, a 2011 album by Circus Devils 
 Capsized (video game), a 2011 science fiction-themed platform game
 "Capsized", a song from the 2016 Andrew Bird album Are You Serious
 Capsize Glacier, Antarctica
 Capsize (band), an American hardcore band

See also
 
 Capesize ships, the largest dry cargo ships  
 Turtling (sailing)